The Tongic languages are a small group of the Polynesian languages. It consists of at least two languages, Tongan and Niuean, and possibly a third, Niuafoʻouan.

See also
 Tonga
 Niue
 Niuafo'ou

References

 
Polynesian languages
Languages of Tonga